Morris Edwin Wood (9 October 1876 – 9 August 1956) was a New Zealand rugby union player and athletics champion. In athletics, he was New Zealand long-jump champion.

Wood was a member of the New Zealand national team from 1901 to 1904.  His 12 matches included New Zealand's first international test, against Australia. In his final match, he captained the Auckland province to a 13–0 defeat of the touring British and Irish Lions.

Wood's 1903 long jump of  would have been the New Zealand record, but was eventually assessed as being wind-assisted and so was not ratified. He went on to win the long jump at the 1904 New Zealand athletics championships, his leap of  taking the title from Te Rangi Hīroa.

Personal life
Morrie Wood was born in Napier, one of four children born to English migrant parents.  He had four children with his wife Clara Ritchey. After her death, he married Kate Donne in 1947. They retired to Paraparaumu, where he died in 1956 at the age of 79.

References

1876 births
1956 deaths
People from Waipawa
New Zealand rugby union players
New Zealand international rugby union players
Bush rugby union players
Hawke's Bay rugby union players
Wellington rugby union players
Canterbury rugby union players
Auckland rugby union players
Rugby union centres
New Zealand male long jumpers
Rugby union players from the Hawke's Bay Region